The Bras d'Or Lakes Scenic Drive is a scenic roadway on Nova Scotia's Cape Breton Island.  It extends around the perimeter of Bras d'Or Lake.

Routes

Numbered 
Highway 105
Trunk 4
Route 205
Route 216
Route 223

Named Roads 
 Church Road
 Georges River Road
 Gillis Point Road
 Hillside Boularderie Road
 Kempt Head Road
 Little Narrows Road
 Long Island Road
 Marble Mountain Road
 Orangedale Road
 St. Columbia Road
 Steele Cross Road
 Washabuck Road
 West Bay Road

Communities

Baddeck
Boularderie Island
Little Bras d'Or
Boisdale
Big Beach
Bras d'Or
Christmas Island
Grand Narrows
Eskasoni
East Bay
Ben Eoin
Irish Cove
Chapel Island
St. Peter's
Dundee
West Bay
Marble Mountain
Orangedale
Whycocomagh
Bucklaw
Little Narrows
Iona
Washabuck
Nyanza

Parks
Battery Provincial Park
Ben Eoin Provincial Park
Bras d'Or Lookoff and Picnic Park
Dalem Lake Provincial Park
Groves Point Provincial Park
MacCormack Provincial Picnic Park,
Whycocomagh Provincial Park

Bridges
Barra Strait Bridge
Crowdis Bridge
Seal Island Bridge

References

Scenic travelways in Nova Scotia
Roads in Inverness County, Nova Scotia
Roads in Victoria County, Nova Scotia
Roads in Richmond County, Nova Scotia
Roads in the Cape Breton Regional Municipality
Tourist attractions in Inverness County, Nova Scotia
Tourist attractions in Victoria County, Nova Scotia
Tourist attractions in Richmond County, Nova Scotia
Tourist attractions in Cape Breton County